T'uqu T'uquyuq (Quechua t'uqu a niche, hole or gap in the wall, the reduplication indicates that there is a group or a complex of something, -yuq a suffix to indicate ownership,  "the one with a complex of niches", also Toco Tocoyoc, Toqotoqoyoq, T'oqot'oqoyoq) or Machu Machuyuq (Quechua machu old, old person, also Machumachuyoc, Machumachuyoq) is an archaeological site with rock paintings in Peru. It is situated in the Cusco Region, Urubamba Province, Yucay District.

References 

Rock art in South America
Archaeological sites in Peru
Archaeological sites in Cusco Region